This group originally included Syria as well as Spain and the Republic of Ireland. However Syria withdrew in support of the African teams who withdrew in protest at the allocation of spots. The Republic of Ireland and Spain subsequently played against each other on a home-and-away basis. When both teams won their home match, a play-off on neutral ground was played to decide who would qualify. This match was initially to be played in London, a city with a large Irish immigrant population, but the Royal Spanish Football Federation and the Football Association of Ireland later came to an agreement and moved the match to Paris.  
Spain won the play-off and qualified for the 1966 FIFA World Cup.

Matches

 

Syria withdrew to support the African teams who had withdrawn in protest at the allocation of spots.

Play-off
Republic of Ireland and Spain finished level on points, and a play-off on neutral ground was played to decide who would qualify. This match was initially to be played in London, a city with a large Irish immigrant population, but the Spanish and Irish football associations later came to an agreement and moved the match to Paris.

Spain qualified.

Team stats

Head coach:  José Villalonga

Head coach:  Johnny Carey

References

External links
FIFA.com
1966 World Cup Qualification RSSSF
Allworldcup

9)
Qual
Qual
Qual
Qual